The 1972 European Super Cup was a football match played over two legs between the winner of the 1971–72 European Cup and the winner of the 1971–72 European Cup Winners' Cup. The match was proposed by Anton Witkamp of De Telegraaf to decide who was the best club in Europe.

History
In 1972, Witkamp proposed the idea to Jaap van Praag, the then president of Ajax, who were holders of the European Cup at that time. The idea was then taken to UEFA to seek official endorsement; however Artemio Franchi, the president of UEFA at that time, rejected the idea as the reigning European Cup Winners' Cup champions—Rangers—were serving a one-year ban at the time imposed by UEFA for the alleged misbehaviour of their fans.

The match went ahead, but unofficially as a celebration of the Rangers' centenary. The first leg was played on 16 January 1973 and the second on 24 January 1973. Ajax won the tie 6–3 on aggregate, beating Rangers both at home and away, 3–1 in Glasgow and 3–2 in the second leg in Amsterdam.

Match details

First leg

Second leg

See also
1971–72 European Cup
1971–72 European Cup Winners' Cup
1972–73 Rangers F.C. season
AFC Ajax in European football
Rangers F.C. in European football

References

External links
RSSSF

Super Cup
1972
Super Cup 1972
Super Cup 1972
Super Cup 1972
Super Cup 1972
Super Cup
Super Cup
Super Cup
Super Cup
European Super Cup, 1972
European Super Cup, 1972
European Super Cup, 1972
European Super Cup, 1972
Football in Glasgow